Miguel Andony Hernández Rodríguez (born June 20, 1981) is a midfielder. He currently plays for Santos Laguna in the Primera División de México.

He began his career in 1999 as a member of Tecos UAG, debuting on April 10, 1999, in a 2–1 loss to Tigres UANL. Hernández became a fixture in the Tecos midfield, recording almost 9,000 minutes played between 1999 and 2007. He was sent to Veracruz, and only played in two games. He was traded to Santos in 2008, and has seen significant playing time in the CONCACAF Champions League, playing in 6 games and scoring 1 goal against the Puerto Rico Islanders.

External links
 

1981 births
Living people
Liga MX players
Santos Laguna footballers
Tecos F.C. footballers
C.D. Veracruz footballers
Association football midfielders
Mexican footballers
Footballers from Guadalajara, Jalisco